Technetium(IV) chloride is the inorganic compound with the formula TcCl4. It was discovered in 1957 as the first binary halide of technetium. It is the highest oxidation binary chloride of technetium that has been isolated as a solid. It is volatile at elevated temperatures and its volatility has been used for separating technetium from other metal chlorides. Colloidal solutions of technetium(IV) chloride are oxidized to form Tc(VII) ions when exposed to gamma rays.

Technetium tetrachloride can be synthesized from the reaction of Cl2 with technetium metal at elevated temperatures between 300 and 500 °C:

Tc + 2 Cl2 → TcCl4

Technetium tetrachloride has also been prepared from the reaction of technetium(VII) oxide with carbon tetrachloride in a sealed vessel at elevated temperature:

Tc2O7 + 7 CCl4 → 2 TcCl4 + 7 COCl2 + 3 Cl2

At 450 °C under vacuum, TcCl4 decomposes to TcCl3 and TcCl2.

As verified by X-ray crystallography, the compound is an inorganic polymer consisting of interconnected TcCl6 octahedra.

References

Technetium compounds
Chlorides
Metal halides